The Regional Municipality of Peel (informally Peel Region or Region of Peel, also formerly Peel County) is a regional municipality in the Greater Toronto Area, Southern Ontario, Canada. It consists of three municipalities to the west and northwest of the city of Toronto: the cities of Mississauga and Brampton, and the town of Caledon, each of which spans its full east–west width. The regional seat is in Brampton. The entire Greater Toronto Area is the inner ring of the Golden Horseshoe.

With a population of about 1.4 million, Peel Region's growth can be credited largely to immigration and transportation infrastructure: seven 400-series highways serve the region, and most of Toronto Pearson International Airport is located within its boundaries.

Mississauga, which occupies the southernmost portion of the region with over 700,000 residents is the largest in population in Peel Region, and is overall the seventh-largest lower-tier municipality in Canada. It reaches from Lake Ontario north to near Highway 407. Brampton, a city with over 500,000 residents is located in the centre of the region, while in the north lies the town of Caledon, which is by far the largest in area and most sparsely populated part of the region.

History 

The area was first settled in the early 1800s after being divided into townships in 1805; some of the townships came into existence later (to 1819). County of Peel was formed in 1851. It was named after Sir Robert Peel, the nineteenth-century Prime Minister of the United Kingdom.

The townships that would eventually constitute Peel were initially part of York County in the Home District, and were designated as the West Riding of York in 1845.

In 1867, Peel officially separated from York County. Peel County was dissolved in 1974.

Brampton was virtually a village in 1834. The only building of consequence at the corner of Hurontario (now Main) and Queen Streets, today the centre of Brampton, was William Buffy's tavern.  In fact, at the time, the area was referred to as "Buffy's Corners".  All real business in Chinguacousy Township took place one mile distant at Martin Salisbury's tavern.  By 1834, John Elliott laid out the area in lots for sale, and applied the name "Brampton" to the area, which was soon adopted by others.<ref name=100years>"Brampton's Beginning" in Brampton's 100th Anniversary as an Incorporated Town: 1873-1973, Brampton: The Corporation of the Town of Brampton and the Brampton Centennial Committee, 1973, originally published in Ross Cumming, ed., Historical Atlas of Peel County, n.p.: Walker and Miles, 1877.</ref>

The Region of Peel was created by the government of Bill Davis in 1974 from the former Peel County, and was legislated to provide community services to the (then) rapidly urbanizing area of south Peel County (now Mississauga and Brampton).

Government and politics

Senior administrators
The senior administrators of the region are:
Nando Iannicca, Regional Chair
Janice Baker, Chief Administrative Officer
Sean Baird, Commissioner of Human Services
Nancy Polsinelli, Commissioner of Health Services
Gary Kent, Chief Financial Officer and Commission of Corporate Services
Keely Deadman, Commissioner of Public Works

Notable government decisions

In 2005, Peel Region approved without tender a $557 million waste management contract commitment lasting 20 years that can potentially allow it to dump garbage in Ontario landfill sites if Michigan bans Canadian trash.
In 2004, Peel Region began a more than $600 million waterworks expansion by conducting invited public tenders, one of Canada's largest in water and wastewater infrastructure.

 Seat assignment controversy 

Seats on Peel Regional council are not assigned to member municipalities according to population or tax contributions, and this has produced considerable controversy within the region.

Mississauga currently comprises about 62 per cent of the region's population and says it contributes 66 per cent of the taxes, but had been assigned 10 of the 21 council seats (or 48 per cent) distributed among the municipalities, with Brampton receiving six and Caledon five. In June 2005, the provincial government passed legislation that will revise the composition of the council. Beginning in the 2006 municipal elections, one additional seat will be assigned to Brampton and two additional seats will be assigned to Mississauga, giving Mississauga 12 of the 24 seats assigned to municipalities. These numbers do not include the regional chair, who is appointed by council members.

These changes are the result of a provincially appointed impartial arbitrator who noted:

Mississauga council, led by former mayor Hazel McCallion, has argued that Peel Region is an unnecessary layer of government which costs Mississauga residents millions of dollars a year to support services in Brampton and Caledon. Mississauga council unanimously passed a motion asking the Province of Ontario to separate Mississauga from Peel Region and become a single-tier municipality, arguing, among other things, the need to keep property tax dollars within the city of Mississauga for the good of the future of the city.

Opponents of Mississauga's position, including former Brampton mayor Susan Fennell, have argued that from the 1970s through the 1990s, Mississauga was the chief beneficiary of Peel's infrastructure construction projects — funded by taxpayers in all three municipalities — and it is now Brampton's turn to benefit, as it is growing faster than Mississauga, which is mostly built-out. As well, they have argued that common infrastructure, such as waste and water services, would be more efficiently managed at a regional level.

Climate
Factors that influence the climate
The region's climate are influenced by various air masses and weather systems from other locations, proximity to Lake Ontario, topography and elevation (e.g. Niagara Escarpment, and Oak Ridges Moraine), and urban and rural land uses. The air masses and weather systems are the major factors in influencing the climate of the region. Being located in Southern Ontario, it is located between the Arctic, subtropics, and the Atlantic Ocean; consequentially, it is impacted by air masses from different origins. In general, the air masses that affect the region are continental polar, continental arctic, maritime polar, and occasionally continental tropical air masses in summer. During winter, cold and dry air masses predominate (continental arctic and maritime polar) although warmer, moister air masses may move north during this time, leading to milder temperatures and potential for heavy snowfall/freezing rain/rainfall. The most severe snow and freezing rain events occur when warmer, moister air masses move northward to the region and meet colder air. During winter, a common type of storm is known as the "Alberta Clipper" which affects the region in which moist Pacific air moves east of the Rocky Mountains to the region, bringing snow that is often followed by the influx of cold continental air afterwards (leads to colder temperatures). Spring and autumn are characterized by variable weather and rapid alternating air masses. This leads to frequent cloudy conditions, rain, and occasional thunderstorms. In summer, the air masses that influence the region are predominantly maritime polar air masses from the Pacific Ocean, and tropical air masses from the Gulf of Mexico, the latter being responsible for bringing heat waves, high humidity, and intense rainfall events. Towards late summer and early autumn, the remnants of tropical storms and hurricanes may bring strong winds and heavy rainfalls to the area. During autumn, Arctic air masses become increasingly common, leading to colder conditions.

The Great Lakes (particularly Lake Ontario) moderate the cooler air masses during autumn and winter, causing the region to have milder conditions than similar areas away from the Lakes. Because the Great Lakes are slower to warm than the land, they keep shoreline areas cooler in spring, leading to prolonged cool weather that persists well into April. The prolonged cool conditions on the shoreline causes the leafing and blossoming of the plants to be delayed, which protects tender plants such as fruit trees from being damaged by late spring frosts. Thus, plants from more warmer climates are able to survive on the shoreline due to this. Occasionally, temperature inversions can occur, particularly in spring and early summer. Temperature inversions occur when warm, moist air from the Gulf of Mexico moves pass the Great Lakes because while the top layers of the Lakes are warmed, the bottom layers remain cool, leading to moisture and airborne pollutants being trapped in the cool air below, humid days, and causing fog, haze, and smog in low laying industrial areas. The Great Lakes also stabilize conditions in spring and summer (due to the relatively cooler lake surfaces), leading to lower spring and summer precipitation on their shorelines compared to inland areas. In winter, lake effect snowfall occurs. In spring and summer, lake breezes can penetrate inland, creating narrow boundaries more inland causing cloudy conditions, severe thunderstorms, and convective rainfall events. This is known as the "lake breeze front" or "lake breeze thunderstorms" phenomenon, in which intense, sharply defined squall lines develop quickly on summer afternoons amplified by localized wind patterns between the Great Lakes. This is seen by the tendency for thunderstorms from the west to weaken/dissipate as they approach Toronto Pearson Airport, located in the southeastern part of the region.

Temperature
Temperatures are higher in the southern parts of Peel compared to the northern parts of the region. Annual temperatures are  warmer in the south than in the northern parts of the region. This is due to the lower elevations found in the southern parts of the region, the moderating effects of Lake Ontario, and more urbanization in the south (due to the urban heat island effect). In colder months, areas closer to Lake Ontario are warmer while in summer, the same areas are colder owing to the moderating effect of the Lake.

Precipitation
Generally, the northwestern parts of Peel region are the wettest areas both seasonally and annually while southern parts are the driest. The north–south precipitation gradient is primarily due to topographic and elevation differences, and some regional storm track differences. The regional storm track differences include the influence of the Great Lakes on summertime convective precipitation, northernmost extent to where tropical air progresses in winter, and positions of frontal zones in spring and autumn). These regional storm track differences are responsible for a slight rain shadow effect for most of Peel except for the northern parts which lie on the windward side and receive more precipitation from frontal systems moving from the west. In all seasons, precipitation mostly comes from low pressure systems from the mid-Atlantic states and Gulf of Mexico.

Statistics

Services
The region is responsible for the services and infrastructure related to water delivery and wastewater treatment, waste collection and disposal, some arterial roads, public health, long-term care centres, Peel Regional Police, Peel Regional Paramedic Services, planning, public housing, paratransit, judicial and social services. Other municipal functions are provided by the three local-tier municipalities. These responsibilities have changed over time, as functions have been uploaded and downloaded to and from the provincial and regional levels, as directed by the Government of Ontario.

Law enforcement
 Peel Regional Police (PRP) provides police coverage for the majority of the region excluding Caledon as well as airport policing within Toronto Pearson International Airport (replaced the RCMP)
 Ontario Provincial Police (OPP) mainly provides policing on:
 Provincial highways (400 series): QEW - Winston Churchill Boulevard to Etobicoke Creek; Highway 401 - from Ninth Line to Highway 427; Highway 403 - from Dundas Street to Highways 410/401; Highway 409 - from Toronto-Pearson International Airport to Highway 427; Highway 410 - from Highway 403 to Highway 10 transition; (Other King's Highways): Highway 9 - from  Highway 10 to Albion Trail; Highway 10 - from Highway 410 transition to Highway 9.
 Patrols privately operated Highway 407 ETR from Highway 403 to Regional Road 50  
 Fulfils a contract to police the town of Caledon.

Education

Education in the Region of Peel is primarily available from taxpayer-funded public schools (secular) and separate schools (Catholic) in both the English and French languages.

Schools in Peel are managed by four school boards: the Peel District School Board (English public), the Dufferin-Peel Catholic District School Board (English separate), the Conseil scolaire Viamonde (French public), and the Conseil scolaire de district catholique Centre-Sud (French separate).

Located in the Peel region are Algoma University Brampton, University of Toronto Mississauga, Lambton College Mississauga, and Sheridan College.

The region is also home to many private post-secondary institutions offering vocational training including Springfield College Brampton, CDI College, TriOS College, Academy of Learning, Evergreen College, Medix College, CIMT College, Torbram College, Bitts International Career College, Canadian College of Business, Science & Technology, Hanson College, Queenswood College B, H & T, Flair College of Management and Technology, Sunview College, and College Of Health Studies.

Other services
Emergency medical services provided by Peel to the region's municipalities:Peel Regional Paramedic ServicesFormerly administered by the province, now in the hands of the region.Long Term CareFacilities are for seniors and others with long-term health needs:
The Davis Centre
Malton Village
Peel Manor
Sheridan Villa
Tall PinesSocial HousingPeel is the largest landlord in the Region. Its non-profit housing company, Peel Living, is one of the largest in Canada.Public WorksPeel manages the regions public works needs including:
 Garbage and Recycling Programs.
 Water works.
 Road maintenance for many major roads — non-provincial roads.TransHelp''

The Region of Peel operates paratransit service for people with disabilities. Transhelp, which was formerly run for Miway in Mississauga, and Brampton Transit in Brampton. Convention transit is operated by the aforementioned transit systems.

Shopping
Major indoor shopping centres located in Peel Region include:
Bramalea City Centre (Brampton)
Shoppers World Brampton (Brampton)
Square One Shopping Centre (Mississauga)
Erin Mills Town Centre (Mississauga)
Dixie Outlet Mall (Mississauga)

Major outdoor centres located in Peel Region include: 
Heartland Town Centre (Mississauga)
Trinity Common (Brampton)

Highways
Seven 400-Series Highways border or pass through Peel Region. These freeways are among the busiest and most modern of Ontario, mostly constructed since the 1970s, and have contributed significantly to the rapid growth of the Region. One of the welcome signs of Brampton has the slogan "All roads lead to Brampton" and shows six 400-series numbers (401, 403, 407, 409, 410, 427).

400-series freeways
Highway 401
Highway 403
Highway 407 (ETR)
Highway 410
Highway 427
Queen Elizabeth Way (QEW)

Other highways
Highway 9, which forms the northern boundary of the region
Highway 10
Highway 50 which forms the eastern boundary of the region (Vaughan) south of Bolton. Note: Highway 50 is no longer officially a provincial highway and is now Peel Road 50.

Demographics 

Ethnicity 

Note: Totals greater than 100% due to multiple origin responses.

Religion 
According to the 2011 Census, 57% of Peel's population was Christian, 10% was Sikh, 10% was Muslim, 9% was Hindu, 3% belonged to other faiths and 13% had no religious affiliation.

Language 
According to the 2011 Census, 50.61% of Peel's population have English as mother tongue; Punjabi is the mother tongue of 8.92% of the population, followed by Urdu (3.84%), Polish (2.68%), Portuguese (2.29%), Tagalog (2.24%), Italian (2.09%), Spanish (2.08%), Arabic (1.96%), and Hindi (1.50%).

See also
 List of municipalities in Ontario
 List of secondary schools in Ontario#Regional Municipality of Peel

Notes

References

Further reading
 Region of Peel fonds at the Peel Art Gallery, Museum and Archives

External links

 
1974 establishments in Ontario
Peel